The Cook County, Illinois, general election was held on November 3, 1992.

Primaries were held March 17, 1992.

Elections were held for Clerk of the Circuit Court, Recorder of Deeds, State's Attorney, three seats on the Water Reclamation District Board, and judgeships on the Circuit Court of Cook County.

Election information
1992 was a presidential election year in the United States. The primaries and general elections for Cook County races coincided with those for federal races (President, House, and Senate) and those for state elections.

Voter turnout

Primary election
Turnout in the primaries was 30.39%, with 1,174,298 ballots cast. Chicago saw 697,781 ballots cast, and suburban Cook County saw 40.20% turnout (with 476,517 ballots cast).

General election
The general election saw turnout of 75.21%, with 2,199,608 ballots cast. Chicago saw 1,137,379 ballots cast, and suburban Cook County saw 75.88% turnout (with 1,062,229 ballots cast).

Straight-ticket voting
Ballots had a straight-ticket voting option in 1992.

Clerk of the Circuit Court 

In the 1992 Clerk of the Circuit Court of Cook County election,  incumbent first-term clerk Aurelia Pucinski, a Democrat, was reelected.

Primaries

Democratic

Republican

General election
Pucinski defeated Cook County commissioner and Palos Township Republican Organization chairman Herbert T. Schumann, Jr. and Harold Washington Party nominee Dee Jones.

Recorder of Deeds 

In the 1992 Cook County Recorder of Deeds election, incumbent first-term recorder of deeds Carol Mosely Braun, a Democrat, did not seek reelection, instead running for United States Senate. Democrat Jesse White was elected to succeed her.

White's election made him the second African-American, after Moseley Braun herself, and first African-American man to hold the office of Cook County recorder of deeds.

Primaries

Democratic

Republican

General election

State's Attorney 

In the 1992 Cook County State's Attorney election, incumbent state's attorney Jack O'Malley, a Republican first elected in a special election in 1990, won reelection to a full term.

This is the last time that a Republican has won election to a Cook County executive office.

Primaries

Democratic
Chicago alderman Patrick J. O'Connor defeated former assistant state's attorney Jim Gierach, Kenneth A. Malatesta, and public guardian Patrick T. Murphy.

Republican

General election

Water Reclamation District Board 

In the 1992 Metropolitan Water Reclamation District of Greater Chicago election, three of the nine seats on the Metropolitan Water Reclamation District of Greater Chicago board were up for election in an at-large election. All three Democratic nominees won.

Judicial elections 
Pasrtisan elections were held for judgeships on the Circuit Court of Cook County due to vacancies. Retention elections were also held for the Circuit Court.

Partisan elections were also held for subcircuit courts judgeships due to vacancies. Retention elections were held for other judgeships.

Ballot questions 
One ballot question was included on ballots county-wide during the November general election, and another was included in the entirety of suburban Cook County (but not in the city of Chicago).

National Health Insurance (advisory referendum)
An advisory referendum on national health insurance was included on ballots county-wide.

911 (suburban advisory referendum)
An advisory referendum on 9-1-1 was included on ballots in suburban Cook County (the entire county excluding the city of Chicago.

Other elections
Coinciding with the primaries, elections were held to elect both the Democratic, Republican, and Harold Washington Party committeemen for the wards of Chicago.

See also 
 1992 Illinois elections

References 

Cook County
Cook County, Illinois elections
Cook County 1992
Cook County
Cook County, Illinois elections